was a town located in Minamishitara District, Aichi Prefecture, Japan.

As of May 1, 2004, the town had an estimated population of 13,565 and a density of 51.45 persons per km2. Its total area was 263.66 km2.

Geography
Hōrai was located in east-central of Aichi Prefecture. Some 90 percent of the village area was covered in mountains and forest, and most was within the borders of the Aichi Kōgen Quasi-National Park

History

Hōraiji village was created in the early Meiji period cadastral reform on 1878, but has existed since at least the Muromachi period as a monzen machi to the mountain cult temple of Hōrai-ji.

On April 1, 1956, Hōraiji and Nagashino villages merged with Nanago village and Ono Town from Yana District to form the town of Hōrai. They were joined by Ebi Town from Minamishitara District and Yamayoshida Village from Yana District on September 30 of the same year.

On October 1, 2005, Hōrai, along with the village of Tsukude (also from Minamishitara District), was merged into the expanded city of Shinshiro and has ceased to exist as an independent municipality.

Recreation
Mount Horai, Aichi is a climbing area located just north of Shinshiro.
It is an area with both bouldering and hard sport climbing, up to 5.14d, on steep volcanic rock.

Byaku-dou (V15) and Epitaph (V15) are well known boulder problems opened by Dai Koyamada.

Climbers are not allowed to leave quick-draws hanging from the routes overnight. According to the priests in charge of the many shrines on Mount Horai, this would greatly upset the numerous spirits that visit the forest.

References

Dissolved municipalities of Aichi Prefecture
Shinshiro, Aichi